Raúl Mena Pedroza (born 22 July 1995) is a Colombian athlete. He competed in the men's 4 × 400 metres relay event at the 2020 Summer Olympics.

References

External links
 

1995 births
Living people
Colombian male sprinters
Athletes (track and field) at the 2020 Summer Olympics
Olympic athletes of Colombia
Sportspeople from Barranquilla
21st-century Colombian people